Abu Ali al-Hassan al-Marrakushi (fl. late 13th century) was a Berber astronomer and mathematician from the Kingdom of Marrakech . He was especially important in the field of trigonometry and practical astronomy. He wrote   (Collection of the Principles and Objectives in the Science of Timekeeping), a treatise on spherical astronomy and astronomical instruments. The first part was translated into French by the orientalist and astronomer  during the early 19th century, and published after Sédillot's death.
 
The treatise, which was written in Cairo between 1276 and 1282, is regarded as the most complete source to have survived about medieval Islamic astronomical instruments.

Legacy
The crater Al-Marrakushi on the Moon is named after him.

References

Sources

Further reading
 
 
 

Moroccan writers
Medieval Moroccan astronomers
Astronomers of the medieval Islamic world
Medieval Moroccan mathematicians
Inventors of the medieval Islamic world
Year of death unknown
People from Marrakesh
13th-century Moroccan people
Year of birth unknown
Medieval Egyptian astronomers
Astronomy in Egypt